Robert Greacen (1920–2008) was an Irish poet and member of Aosdána. Born in Derry, Ireland, on 24 October 1920, he was educated at Methodist College Belfast and Trinity College Dublin. He died on 13 April 2008 in Dublin, Ireland.

Greacen's literary career has included poetry, reviewing, and editing.

Publications
His published poetry collections include The Bird (1941), Northern Harvest (Belfast, Derrick MacCord, 1944), One Recent Evening (1944), The Undying Day (London, The Falcon Press, 1948), A Garland for Captain Fox (Dublin, The Gallery Press, 1975), I, Brother Stephen (Dublin, St. Beuno's, 1978), Young Mr Gibbon (1979), A Bright Mask, (Dublin, The Dedalus Press, 1985), Protestant Without a Horse (Belfast, The Lagan Press, 1997), Carnival at The River (Dublin; Dedalus;, 1990); Collected Poems (Lagan Press, 1995), Lunch at the Ivy (Lagan Press, 2002), and Selected & New Poems (ed. by Jack W. Weaver, Cliffs of Moher, Salmon Publishing, 2006).

Robert Greacen: Collected Poems 1944-1994, won the Irish Times Award for Literature in 1995.

His autobiography, Even Without Irene, was published by the Dolmen Press in 1969 and re-issued in 1995 by Lagan Press. An expanded autobiography, The Sash My Father Wore, was published in Edinburgh by Mainstream Publishing in 1997.

Personal life 
He was married to the late Patricia Hutchins, author of Ezra Pound's Kensington and James Joyce's Dublin. They had one daughter, Arethusa Greacen, who resides in the Republic of Ireland.

References

Further reading 

 The Times: Robert Greacen Poet who at the request of T. S. Eliot compiled The Faber Book of Contemporary Irish Poetry
 Guardian Obituary 

1920 births
2008 deaths
Male poets from Northern Ireland
Writers from Derry (city)
Writers from Dublin (city)
Aosdána members
People educated at Methodist College Belfast
20th-century poets from Northern Ireland
Male writers from Northern Ireland
Autobiographers from Northern Ireland
20th-century British male writers